Anna Maria Mazzacurati (born 12 February 1944) is a former Italian javelin thrower five-time national champion at senior level.

Achievements

National titles
Mazzacurati won five national championships.
 Italian Athletics Championships
 Javelin throw: 1963, 1966, 1967, 1968, 1969

Personal bests
Javelin throw: 46.86 m ( Rome, 30 May 1965)

References

External links
 Coppa Europa Story: 1965: La prima edizione 

1944 births
Italian female javelin throwers
Living people
Athletes from Rome